The Hyphen War was the political conflict over what to call Czechoslovakia after the fall of the Communist government in 1989.

Background 
The official name of the country during the last 30 years of Communist rule was "Czechoslovak Socialist Republic" (in Czech and in Slovak , or ČSSR). In December 1989—a month after the Velvet Revolution—President Václav Havel announced that the word "Socialist" would be dropped from the country's official name. Conventional wisdom suggested that it would be known as simply the "Czechoslovak Republic", which was its official name from 1920 to 1938 and again during the Third Czechoslovak Republic and early years of the Czechoslovak Socialist Republic (1945–1960).

However, Slovak politicians felt this diminished Slovakia's equal stature, and demanded that the country's name be spelled with a hyphen (i.e. "Czecho-Slovak Republic"), as it was spelled from independence in 1918 until 1920, and again during the Second Czechoslovak Republic (1938–1939). President Havel then changed his proposal to "Republic of Czecho-Slovakia"—a proposal that did not sit well with Czech politicians who saw reminders of the 1938 Munich Agreement, in which Nazi Germany annexed a part of that territory.

Resolution
As a compromise, on 29 March 1990 the Czechoslovak parliament resolved that the country's long name was to be the "Czechoslovak Federative Republic," explicitly acknowledging that the country was a federation.  The name was to be spelled without a hyphen in Czech, but with a hyphen in Slovak. An informal agreement on the Slovak long-form name was to be codified in a future law on state symbols.

This solution was found to be unsatisfactory, and less than a month later, on 20 April 1990, the parliament changed the name again, to the "Czech and Slovak Federative Republic" (or ČSFR).  This law explicitly listed the long-form names in both languages and stated they were equal.

Generally, only the first word of a country's name is capitalized in Czech and Slovak. Capitalizing all of the words eliminated issues of prestige around the capitalization of "".

Although the Slovaks were demanding a hyphen (Czech,), the Czechs called it a dash (Czech,). Although there is a clear difference between a hyphen and a dash in Czech and Slovak spelling (a hyphen is used to mark a connection between two words, while a dash is used in other cases), both Czechs and Slovaks usually use the term  for both. Nonetheless, English language media generally refer to the conflict as the "Hyphen War".

While the Hyphen War was not really deserving of the name "war", it demonstrated that there were differences between Czechs and Slovaks regarding the identity of their shared country. Over the following two years, more substantial disputes arose between the two halves of the federation. In 1992, Czech and Slovak politicians agreed to split the country into the two states of the Czech Republic and Slovak Republic—the so-called Velvet Divorce—which became effective on 1 January 1993.

See also
 Name of the Czech Republic
 Dissolution of Czechoslovakia

References

External links
 "Velvet Revolution to Velvet Divorce", Hoover Institution (PDF)

Politics of Czechoslovakia
Geographical naming disputes
1990 in Czechoslovakia
1990 in politics